William Jackson, also known as Action Jackson (December 13, 1920 – August 11, 1961) was an enforcer and loan collector for the Chicago Outfit. He earned his nickname of "Action" because it was slang for "Juice Man", which meant debt-collector. He was tortured to death by his fellow gangsters, allegedly on suspicion that he had become an informant for the FBI.

Criminal career

Chicago police described Jackson as "a man with the body of a giant and the brain of a child", who was known in syndicate circles as a mob "juice" collector who specialized in pain for delinquent customers. In 1941 he was arrested in Green Bay, Wisconsin, for assault and robbery. In 1947, he was arrested and charged with rape, but was not convicted. In 1949, he was arrested and sentenced to four to eight years in prison for robbery. In 1953, he was paroled and became a muscle man for gangsters in Chicago.

In 1961, Jackson was arrested along with five others at a warehouse as they were unloading $70,000 worth of electrical appliances from a stolen truck. While the others tried to escape, Jackson stood still because he was too fat to run. Agents learned that Jackson was a "juice" collector for Sam DeStefano.

Suspected informant

In 1960, FBI agent Bill Roemer asked Jackson to become an informant for the FBI. Being a loyal member of the Outfit, Jackson declined.

Nonetheless, in 1961 Jackson was so accused. According to sources, he was kidnapped and taken to a meat-rendering plant on Chicago's South Side, where he was tortured by Outfit gangsters. It is suspected that his killers took Jackson there at gunpoint, where he was tortured and killed in what is known as one of the most brutal gangland killings in American history.

Torture and death

When police found the almost naked body of Jackson, he was face forward with rope marks on his wrists and feet. He had many cuts and burns all over his body, his chest had been crushed and he had a hole in his right ear from some type of sharp object.

Jackson was impaled through his rectum with a meat hook, hanging a foot in the air, while being questioned by mob enforcers. Jackson kept insisting he was not an informer but his torturers did not believe him. They stripped him naked, smashed his kneecaps with a bat,  one of them shot him with a gun, broke his ribs, stuck him with sharp objects, used a cattle prod on his penis and anus making him evacuate his bowels, burned parts of his body with a blow torch. Then they left him for three days until he finally succumbed to his wounds.

Jackson's body was found on August 12, 1961, in the trunk of his own car, which  had been abandoned on Lower Wacker Drive in Chicago.

Other theories

According to Gus Russo, author of The Outfit, there were Mob insiders who believed Jackson was killed for raping an imprisoned Mob-connected burglar's wife. Russo also states that Mrs. Humphreys, wife of Outfit fixer Murray "The Camel" Humphreys, asserted the conversation where the government learned about Jackson's fate was staged by mobsters who were aware that the government had planted a microphone. These possibilities have not been verified.

On film
Jackson's death is named and shown near the beginning of the semi-biographical movie on Lee Harvey Oswald assassin Jack Ruby named Ruby. He is portrayed by Frank Orsatti in the film.

References

External links
The Rosemont Two Step by John William Tuohy at AmericanMafia.com
 

1961 deaths
Murdered American gangsters
People from Chicago
People murdered by the Chicago Outfit
1920 births
People murdered in Illinois
Male murder victims
American torture victims
Chicago Outfit mobsters